Gaoqiao is a town located in a valley in Kai County, in the northeast of Chongqing municipality in Southwest China.

On 23 December 2003 at 21:15, a gas well burst and released highly toxic hydrogen sulfide. According to China Daily, 233 people died and at least 9,000 were injured.

The well was called “” and belonged to PetroChina's Southwest Oil and Gas Field Branch. It was located in the Chuandongbei gas field in Gaoqiao's Xiaoyang village.

In 2007, Chevron Corporation and China National Petroleum Corporation signed a contract to share production in Chuandongbei, with Chevron getting 49 percent of the venture, operating the project and supplying the technology.

References

External links 
 Gas well blowout kills at least 191 – Article in the China Daily, dated 2003-12-25
 China tries to plug burst natural gas well – Article on MSNBC, dated 2003-12-25

Man-made disasters in China
Chemical disasters
Township-level divisions of Chongqing